Xestia sincera is a moth in the family Noctuidae.

References

External links
Lepiforum.de

Xestia
Moths of Europe